Manali Petrochemical Ltd. (MPL) is a petrochemical company based in Chennai, India. Established in 1986, it markets propylene glycol and polyols

Manali Petrochemical annually produces 27000 metric tonnes of propylene oxide, 14,000 metric tonnes of propylene glycol and 15,000 metric tonnes of polyether polyol and system polyol.

Manali Petrochemical Ltd Plant-I (originally built by SPIC) set up with the technology of Atochem for manufacture of PO and PG and that of Arco for manufacture of Polyuol acquired through Technip, France. Manali Petrochemical Ltd Plant-II (originally joint venture of UB and TIDCO) was merged with MPL later utilizes the technology of Enichem of Italy for the PO and PG and Press Industrial for manufacture of Polyol. MPL markets its Polyols with isocyanates sourced indigenously as well as imported from Japan and China and the pre-polymers produced at MPL in meeting the demand of polyurethane industry in India.

References

External links
 Official website

Companies based in Chennai
Petrochemical companies of India
1986 establishments in Tamil Nadu
Chemical companies established in 1986
Indian companies established in 1986